This is a list of museums in Barcelona, the capital city of Catalonia, Spain.

Defunct museums 

Museu Barbier-Mueller d'Art Precolombí
Museu Clarà
Museu d'Art Modern
Museu de la Ciència de Barcelona
Museu de la Moto
Museu del Calçat
Museu del Clavegueram
Museu del Còmic i la Il·lustració (closed 2009)
Museu del Gabinet Numismàtic de Catalunya
Museu d'Idees i Invents
Museu del Mamut
Museu del Rock
Museu Fundació Francisco Godia
Museu Militar de Barcelona (closed May 2009)
Museu Municipal de Belles Arts
Museu Pedagògic Experimental
Museu Provincial d'Antiguitats
Museu Social
Palau Reial de Pedralbes (closed 2013)
 (now part of the Design Museum of Barcelona)
Museu de les Arts Decoratives (now part of the Design Museum of Barcelona)
Museu Tèxtil i d'Indumentària (now part of the Design Museum of Barcelona)
Gabinet de les Arts Gràfiques (now part of the Design Museum of Barcelona)
Blueproject Foundation

See also 
 List of libraries in Barcelona
 List of markets in Barcelona
 List of theatres and concert halls in Barcelona
 List of museums in Catalonia

References

External links
 List of museums in Barcelona
 List of museums in Barcelona (German Overview) 

Museums Barcelona
Museums in Barcelona
Barcelona
Museums